The Gordon Hotel is a historic hotel building located at 100-110 East Vermilion Street in Lafayette, Louisiana.

Originally built in 1904 by George Knapp and designed by Favrot and Livaudais, the hotel was a three-story brick and stucco building in Renaissance Revival style. An extensive remodeling happened in 1928, with William T. Nolan supervision, which added a fourth Baroque styled story to the building, including an undulated roof and a corner obelisk. The 1928 remodeling also added a three-story addition to the east side of the building.

The building was listed on the National Register of Historic Places on June 25, 1982.

See also
 National Register of Historic Places listings in Lafayette Parish, Louisiana

References

Hotel buildings on the National Register of Historic Places in Louisiana
Renaissance Revival architecture in Louisiana
Hotel buildings completed in 1904
Lafayette Parish, Louisiana
National Register of Historic Places in Lafayette Parish, Louisiana